Yatton is a village and parish in south-east Herefordshire, England. The population of the civil parish at the 2011 census was 208.

All Saints' Church is a Victorian church building of 1841 and an active Church of England parish church. It is Grade II listed.

Yatton Chapel is a redundant Anglican church in the care of the Churches Conservation Trust. It is recorded in the National Heritage List for England as a designated Grade II* listed building. The chapel stands at the end of a winding track adjacent to Chapel Farmhouse.

References

Civil parishes in Herefordshire
Villages in Herefordshire